The Algol-class vehicle cargo ships, also known as Fast Sealift Ships (FSS) or SL-7s, are currently the fastest cargo ships in the world, capable of speeds in excess of .  Originally built in 1972 and 1973 as high-speed container ships known as SL-7's for Sea-Land Services, Inc., the ships' high operating costs limited their profitability.  All eight ships were acquired by the US Navy in 1981 and 1982, with the last ship converted, delivered to and placed in service with Military Sealift Command in 1986.  The conversion entailed the installation of four cranes, addition of roll on/roll off capability and a redesign of the cargo hold to better facilitate storage of vehicles.  Due largely to their high cost of operation, all fast sealift ships are kept in Reduced Operating Status, but can be activated and ready to sail in 96 hours. All ships are named after bright stars in the night sky.

Service
All eight ships took part in Operations Desert Shield and Desert Storm, delivering thirteen percent of all the cargo transported between the United States and Saudi Arabia during and after the Persian Gulf War.  Fast sealift ships have taken part in Operations Restore Hope, Joint Guardian, Enduring Freedom and Iraqi Freedom in addition to humanitarian relief efforts across the globe.
On 1 October 2007, the United States Maritime Administration began operating all eight FSS. All eight were transferred to the Ready Reserve on 1 Oct. 2008.  At this time their USNS designations were replaced with SS designations as they were no longer US Navy Ships.

Antares propulsion failure
From GlobalSecurity.org: 
Unfortunately, one FSS, the Antares, failed off the East coast of the United States with a considerable amount of the 24th Infantry Division (Mechanized) equipment and 100 soldiers aboard. The ship was towed to Rota, Spain by the ocean-going tugboat Apache. Some of the cargo was airlifted to Saudi Arabia but most had to be unloaded and reloaded by the soldiers and Seebees aboard the FSS USNS Altaire returning from her initial voyage. This cargo arrived about three weeks later than planned. (Before the war, the Antares had been scheduled for major overhaul, but this was delayed. Thus a degree of risk was accepted in the decision to use Antares to speed the deployment.)

Fast Sealift Ships

 SS Algol (T-AKR-287) (formerly SS Sea-Land Exchange)
 SS Bellatrix (T-AKR-288) (formerly SS Sea-Land Trade)
 SS Denebola (T-AKR-289) (formerly SS Sea-Land Resource)
 SS Pollux (T-AKR-290) (formerly SS Sea-Land Market)
 SS Altair (T-AKR-291) (formerly SS Sea-Land Finance)
 SS Regulus (T-AKR-292) (formerly SS Sea-Land Commerce)
 SS Capella (T-AKR-293) (formerly SS Sea-Land McLean)
 SS Antares (T-AKR-294) (formerly SS Sea-Land Galloway)

References

External links
United States Navy Fact File: Fast Sealift Ships – T-AKR
Naval Vessel Register: Fast Sealift – Support (FSS), Specialized
Globalsecurity.org
Military Sealift Command fact sheet

 
Auxiliary ship classes of the United States Navy
High speed vessels of the United States Navy
Auxiliary transport ship classes